Lüliang or Lyuliang is a prefecture-level city in the west of Shanxi province, People's Republic of China, bordering Shaanxi province across the Yellow River to the west, Jinzhong and the provincial capital of Taiyuan to the east, Linfen to the south, and Xinzhou to the north.

History

In 2010 the city had a GDP growth rate at 21%; at the time prices for coal were high and the city had an active coal industry. There were plans to build a new business district in Lüliang, and the city's mayor had strongly pushed for the plan. In 2014 the GDP declined by 2%. By 2015 due to a slowing economy plans in that city stalled and many apartment blocks were left unoccupied. By 2015 the mayor lost his job due to corruption.

In July 2021, following a Chinese government crackdown on the Abrahamic faiths in China, Christian Church Minister Zhao Weikai was arrested and charged with “illegal holding of materials promoting terrorism and extremism” by the municipal police and was forbidden from meeting with his legal council. This incident was used by various human rights groups as an example of religious persecution by the Chinese Communist Party. 

The Chinese-American reproductive biologist Min Chueh Chang was born in Lüliang in 1908.

Administration
Lüliang has direct jurisdiction over 1 district, 2 county-level cities, and 10 counties:

Climate 
Lüliang has a monsoon-influenced continental climate, that, under the Köppen climate classification, falls on the borderline between the semi-arid (Köppen BSk) and humid continental (Dwa) regimes, and features large diurnal temperature variation. Winters are cold and very dry, while summers are hot and slightly humid. Close to three-fourths of the annual precipitation occurs from June to September.

Transportation 
China National Highway 209
Lüliang Dawu Airport
Taiyuan-Zhongwei-Yinchuan Railway

References

External links
Official website of Lüliang government

 
Cities in Shanxi
Prefecture-level divisions of Shanxi